Rex Cinemas Mackenzie, formerly Rex Cinemas and Rex Theatre, is an Art Deco style cinema building in Singapore. the cinema was adjacent to Ellison building along Mackenzie Road. The cinema was bounded by major road, Bukit Timah Road and secondary roads Mackenzie and Selegie Road.

History 
Built on the former site of the Singapore Boxing Stadium which was closed and demolished in 1946, the theatre opened in 1964. It started out as a cinema, a concert venue, then an ice skating rink, into a church, a disco and back to being a cinema again.

The theatre hall was different from the other cinemas in Singapore in terms of its layout organisation. The front and back stalls seats of the cinema hall sloped downwards to meet each other. This gives movie watchers seated in the front to have a better view of the screen without straining their necks.

The first film screened in Rex Theatre was an English film, The Jungle Book. 

In 1967, Shaw Organisation took over the cinema.

As its peak popularity in 1976, Rex Theatre attracted the largest crowd when they screened Earthquake which came with new sensurround sound effects that sent simulated vibrations around the cinema seats, depicting a real earthquake. 

Due to rampant videotape piracy, business for the cinema plunged. The cinema eventually closed in 1983 and the last film shown at Rex was Jaws 3-D.

In 1985, Rex Theatre was converted into a performance house with famous singers from Taiwan and Hong Kong. They held their concert there and attracted a lot of people.

In 1989, the theatre was converted into an ice rink, Fuji Ice Palace. It ceased operations in 1993.

Foo Chow Methodist Church step in and took over Rex Theatre in 1999 for a year to hold worship services. It functioned as a temporary church as the original church along 90 Race Course Road was undergoing reconstruction and upgrading when it was discovered to be unsafe for operation due to tunnelling works for an MRT line. A year later, the church then moved back to its own premises.

In 2000, it was reopened as a disco known as TJ Live House @ The Rex. 

In 2007, Rex Theatre was left abandoned.

Senthil Kumar, along with his father Narayanasamy Muthu, who runs a few businesses which jewellery chain Kamala Jewellers in Singapore, decide to breathe new life into the former Rex Theatre by chipping in S$2 million. They had an interior make over with an addition of 2 smaller halls upstairs and the main hall filled with 570 seats while the other two, could hold 82 patrons each. The theatre was reopened as Rex Cinemas in 2009, which a majority of Indian and foreign workers patronised due to its Hindi, Indian and Bollywood films. There were Indian Muslim shops nearby selling food where it hoped to bring back memories of hawker stalls along the side lane of Rex back in the past.

In August 2017, the premises was acquired by Carnival Cinemas and renamed as Rex Cinemas Mackenzie. The cinema ceased operation in July 2018.

References 

Cinemas in Singapore
Former cinemas
Theatres in Singapore
Landmarks in Singapore
1946 establishments in the British Empire
1946 establishments in Singapore